Alan Fine is an American chief executive.

Early life and education
Fine attended the University of Rhode Island to receive a Bachelor of Arts degree.

Career
Fine later became the Senior Vice President of Marketing for Coleco Toys. At Caldor, The May Department Stores Company division, he was vice president and the Seasonal Merchandise Division Manager. Fine later joined the management at Kay-Bee Toys as Senior Vice President and General Merchandise Manager, then was promoted to president and Chief Operating Officer. In 1996, Fine became employed by Marvel Entertainment Group. Fine became the Toy Biz divisional Chief Executive Officer in 1998 under the newly merged Marvel Enterprises. Marvel Publishing Chief Executive Officer was added to his portfolio in 2004. For Marvel Characters, Inc., the licensing unit of Marvel, he was Executive Vice President and Chief Marketing Officer. In April 2009, Fine was promoted to Executive Vice President, Office of the Chief Executive, joining David Maisel, John Turitzin, and Isaac Perlmutter, Marvel CEO in overseeing all operations. Fine also chaired Marvel's Creative Committee. Fine was later promoted to president, Marvel Entertainment. Fine was later reported to have left Marvel following disputes with Kevin Feige.

References

20th-century births
Living people
American chief operating officers
Marvel Entertainment people
University of Rhode Island alumni
Year of birth missing (living people)